{{DISPLAYTITLE:C13H19NO4}}
The molecular formula C13H19NO4 (molar mass: 253.29 g/mol, exact mass: 253.1314 u) may refer to:

 N-Acetylmescaline
 2,3,4,5-Tetramethoxyamphetamine

Molecular formulas